Buxbaum is a German surname meaning box tree. Notable people with the surname include:

Franz Buxbaum (1900–1979), Austrian botanist
Friedrich Buxbaum (1869–1948), Austrian cellist
Helmuth Buxbaum (1939–2007), Prussian-born Canadian–American businessman, convict
Johann Christian Buxbaum (1693–1730), German physician and botanist
Joseph Buxbaum, American neuroscientist
Josh Blake (born 1975), born Joshua Buxbaum, American actor

See also 
Buchsbaum
Bucksbaum

German-language surnames